Chay Kandi or Chaykendi may refer to:
 Chay Kandi, Heris
 Chay Kandi, Kaleybar
 Chay Kandi, Khoda Afarin
 Chay Kandi, Varzaqan